Kieron Rogers (born 8 September 1988) is an Anguillan sprinter. He competed in the 100 metres event at the 2013 World Championships in Athletics.

References

1988 births
Living people
Anguillan male sprinters
Place of birth missing (living people)
Athletes (track and field) at the 2010 Commonwealth Games
Athletes (track and field) at the 2014 Commonwealth Games
Commonwealth Games competitors for Anguilla
World Athletics Championships athletes for Anguilla